Tullyhunco is a barony in County Cavan, Ireland. It comprises the civil parishes of Kildallan, Killeshandra and Scrabby.

Location
Tullyhunco is located in western County Cavan. It borders County Leitrim to the west and County Longford to the south. At 165.5 km2 (40,872 acres), Tullyhunco is the second smallest of Cavan's eight baronies after Loughtee Lower.

History
Another name for it was Clonballykernan [Source?]. For centuries it was part of the Kingdom of Breifne, a loose union of chiefdoms that the O'Rourkes ruled as overlords. Following the dissolution of the kingdom, the area was still in the orbit of the O'Rourke kingdom of West Breifne until the early 1500s, when the Mág Tighearnáns switched allegiance to the O'Reilly of East Breifne. In 1579 the area was subsumed into the newly formed county of Cavan. In 1584 the barony of Tullyhunco was officially demarcated and granted to clan Mág Tighearnán by the Kingdom of Ireland.

List of settlements

Settlements in Tullyhunco include:
Arvagh
Killeshandra
Cornafean

Further reading
 C. Parker, "Two minor septs of late medieval Breifne", in Breifne Journal, Vol. VIII, No. 31 (1995), pp. 566–586.
 M. Nallen, 'A study of eight townlands in the parish of Killeshandra', in Breifne Journal, Vol. IX, No. 35 (1999), pp. 5-85
 M. McShane, 'Land "parcells" of Tullyhunco from the Ulster inquisitions of 1629', in Breifne Journal, Vol. XIII, No. 51 (2016), pp. 756–781.
 M.V. Duignan (1934), "The Uí Briúin Bréifni genealogies", pp. 90–137, in JRSAI Vol. 4, No. 1, 30 Jun. 1934.
 J. Devereux Kernan, 'The Utica Kernans: descendants of Bryan Kernan, gentleman, of the townland of Ned in the parish of Killeshandra, barony of Tullyhunco, county of Cavan, Province of Ulster, Kingdom of Ireland.'
 J. Devereux Kernan, 'Supplement to The Utica Kernans: descendants of Bryan Kernan, gentleman, of the townland of Ned in the parish of Killeshandra, Barony of tullyhunco, County of Cavan, Province of Ulster, Kingdom of Ireland, 1968-1993'

References

External links

Plantation of Ulster 1611 map - Tullyhunco Land Grants 

Baronies of County Cavan